Latrophilin 3 is a protein that in humans is encoded by the ADGRL3 gene.

Function 

This gene encodes a member of the latrophilin subfamily of G protein-coupled receptors (GPCR). Latrophilins may function in both cell adhesion and signal transduction. In experiments with non-human species, endogenous proteolytic cleavage within a cysteine-rich GPS (G-protein-coupled-receptor proteolysis site) domain resulted in two subunits (a large extracellular N-terminal cell adhesion subunit and a subunit with substantial similarity to the secretin/calcitonin family of GPCRs) being non-covalently bound at the cell membrane.

Clinical significance 

A version of this gene has been linked to attention deficit hyperactivity disorder (ADHD).

See also 
 Adhesion G protein-coupled receptors

References

Further reading

External links 
 PDBe-KB provides an overview of all the structure information available in the PDB for Human Adhesion G protein-coupled receptor L3 
 PDBe-KB provides an overview of all the structure information available in the PDB for Mouse Adhesion G protein-coupled receptor L3 

Latrophilins
Biology of attention deficit hyperactivity disorder